Non ideal compressible fluid dynamics is a branch of fluid mechanics studying the actual characteristics of dense vapors, supercritical flows and compressible two-phase flows, namely whereby the thermodynamic behavior of the fluid differs considerably from that of a perfect gas. At high reduced pressure and temperature, close to the saturation curve the speed of sound is largely sensitive to density variations along isentropes. Consequently, the fluid flow departs from the ideality assumption and under particular conditions may even exhibit non classical gas dynamic phenomena, whose nature is governed by the value of the fundamental derivative of gas-dynamics Γ. A non-monotonic Mach number trend along an expansion is typical for 0 < Γ < 1, while for Γ < 0 values admit the occurrence of inverse gas-dynamics phenomena such as rarefaction shock waves , splitting waves or even composite waves. Inverse gas-dynamics behavior has been theoretically predicted for heavy complex molecules in the vapor region, and a recent study discovered that two-phase rarefaction shock waves are physically realizable close to the critical point.

Applications
Application of non-ideal compressible fluid dynamics flows can be found in numerous fields. They are encountered in Organic Rankine Cycle turbogenerators, refrigerator, supercritical carbon dioxide power system, pharmaceutical processes, transportation of fuels at high-speed, and in transonic and supersonic wind tunnels.

References

Fluid mechanics